Brendan O'Brien is an American screenwriter, best known for writing 2014 film Neighbors along with Andrew J. Cohen.

Early life and education
O'Brien and his screenwriter-director friend Andrew J. Cohen were both born and grew up in Scarsdale, New York, and both went to Scarsdale Middle School, where they became friends in the sixth grade. O'Brien graduated from Georgetown University.

Career 
In 2014, O'Brien co-wrote the script for the comedy film Neighbors along with Cohen, starring Zac Efron and Seth Rogen. The film was directed by Nicholas Stoller and released on May 9, 2014.

O'Brien and Cohen also co-wrote the scripts for two 2016 films, Neighbors 2: Sorority Rising and Mike and Dave Need Wedding Dates.

O'Brien and Cohen also co-wrote the 2017 comedy film The House. Cohen made his directing debut with the film.

O'Brien is set to pen the screenplay for Teenage Mutant Ninja Turtles: Mutant Mayhem, with Jeff Rowe directing. The film will release on August 4, 2023

Personal life 
O'Brien is married to Amanda Headrick. They have two boys, Gabriel and Jack.

Filmography 
 Neighbors (2014)
 Neighbors 2: Sorority Rising (2016)
 Mike and Dave Need Wedding Dates (2016)
 The House (2017)
 Teenage Mutant Ninja Turtles: Mutant Mayhem (2023)
 Back in Action (TBD)

References

External links 
 

Living people
American male screenwriters
Georgetown University alumni
Film producers from New York (state)
People from Scarsdale, New York
Screenwriters from New York (state)
Year of birth missing (living people)
21st-century American screenwriters
21st-century American male writers